The Cordillera Central salamander (Bolitoglossa nigrescens) is a species of salamander in the family Plethodontidae.

It is endemic to Costa Rica.
Its natural habitat is subtropical or tropical moist montane forests.
It is threatened by habitat loss.

Sources

Bolitoglossa
Endemic fauna of Costa Rica
Amphibians described in 1949
Taxonomy articles created by Polbot